The 2009–10 season was Tottenham Hotspur's 18th season in the Premier League. It was their 32nd successive season in the top division of the English football league system.

Tottenham began the season under the stewardship of veteran manager Harry Redknapp in his first full season at the club. Relative to previous seasons, Tottenham's transfer dealings were limited, with only seven players brought in during the two transfer windows; 16 players left White Hart Lane over the course of the season.

Tottenham achieved UEFA Champions League football for the first time in their history, having not participated in the top European competition since 1961–62, by finishing fourth, ensuring their highest ever Premier League standing. They accumulated 70 points and finished the season with an average attendance of 35,794 for the second season running, the ninth-highest in the Premier League.

Season 2009–2010

Pre-season

Transfers

Tottenham's transfer involvement began on the first day of the newly opened transfer window with the release of a number of reserve and youth players, the most notable being former Portuguese international Ricardo Rocha, who in late August joined Belgian outfit Standard Liège. Tottenham's outgoing transfers continued into July, as defensive midfielder Didier Zokora joined Sevilla for around £8.6 million, swiftly followed by Welsh international right-back Chris Gunter making a £1.75 million move to Nottingham Forest, a team who Gunter had spent the end of the 2008–09 season with on loan. Also, Brazilian left-back Gilberto ended his spell at Spurs, moving back to Cruzeiro in the Brasileirão.

The first acquisitions made in the summer transfer window were the signings of youngsters Kyle Naughton and Kyle Walker, both from Sheffield United. Naughton moved straight into the first team, receiving the number 16 shirt, whereas Walker received a loan move back to Sheffield United for a year to continue his development at the Championship club.

Tottenham's largest transfer fee of the summer was spent signing Peter Crouch back to the club from Portsmouth. Crouch began his career at White Hart Lane before a move to Queens Park Rangers ended his time at Spurs, but with a move of around £9 million, he became the fourth player to make a return to Spurs after leaving in the past six months. The money spent on Crouch was recouped by the sale of striker Darren Bent; Bent entered into a protracted transfer deal with Sunderland which was threatened, not only by the large bid lodged from Stoke City during negotiations, but by comments made by Bent on his Twitter page, criticising chairman Daniel Levy, to which he made a public apology. Bent joined Sunderland for £10 million.

Tottenham's summer continued with the arrival of Sébastien Bassong from Newcastle United for £8 million. During their pre-season, Spurs were hit with the double blow of losing both Jonathan Woodgate and Michael Dawson to serious injury and with the permanently semi-injured Ledley King the only fit central defender, the transfer impetus switched to defence, facilitating the arrival of Bassong.

Friendlies
Tottenham began their pre-season schedule on 15 July 2009 with an away trip to St. James Park to face Exeter City. Tottenham won the encounter 3–0 against their League One opponents, A first-half goal from Jamie O'Hara set Spurs on their way before two goals in ten minutes from Aaron Lennon and Darren Bent ensured Tottenham's pre-season began with a winning start. Two days later, Tottenham took a southwest trip by facing both Harry Redknapp and Kevin Bond's former club, AFC Bournemouth, Tottenham replicated their result by running out 3–0 winners. Robbie Keane got his first goal of the pre-season campaign halfway through the first half, followed by a goal from Jermain Defoe, returning to his former club with whom he had a successful loan period in the 2000–01 season. The game was rounded off by a goal from Wilson Palacios, scoring his first-ever goal in English football.

Tottenham continued their pre-season by facing newly promoted Championship side Peterborough United at the London Road. Spurs ended the match having won 4–0 with goals scored by Darren Bent, Jermain Defoe, Luka Modrić and Roman Pavlyuchenko, taking their tally to ten goals scored in three games and zero conceded.

Beginning in late July, Spurs participated in the inaugural Wembley Cup. They began the tournament by facing off against Barcelona. Barcelona fielded a changed team, featuring a number of young players, Barcelona had the better of the first half, taking the lead through forward Bojan. Tottenham improved in the second half and earned a draw with a late header through youngster Jake Livermore. In the final game of the tournament, Spurs faced Scottish club Celtic. Tottenham suffered their first friendly loss in five years by losing 2–0. An early header from Chris Killen put Celtic 1–0 up before Celtic got their second through Georgios Samaras, a solo run earned the two goal cushion and eventually the win to claim the Wembley Cup. Egyptian champions Al Ahly were also a part of the tournament but were not an opponent of Spurs and finished bottom of the final group standings.

Following the Wembley Cup, Tottenham competed in the 2009 Asia Trophy Tournament alongside fellow Premier League outfits West Ham United, Hull City and Chinese Super League team Beijing Guoan. Tottenham started the tournament against West Ham, winning 1–0. Goalkeeper Robert Green made several saves before ex-West Ham player Jermain Defoe returned to haunt his former club with a finish from close range to send Spurs to the final. Tottenham then claimed the Trophy with a 3–0 win over Hull City. Robbie Keane claimed two goals, one from open play and one from the penalty spot, and Aaron Lennon wrapped up the game with a tap-in, supplied by new signing Kyle Naughton.

The Far-East section of the 2009–10 pre-season was then rounded off with a trip to Hong Kong to play the Hong Kong First Division champions South China. Tottenham lost the match 2–0, South China took the lead through Chan Siu Ki with a 30-yard volley before Li Haiqiang sealed the game from the penalty spot, with South China goalkeeper, Zhang Chunhui producing several saves to deny Tottenham any sort of comeback.

Tottenham completed their 2009–10 pre-season by beating Greek opposition Olympiacos 3–0. Spurs gave debuts to Peter Crouch and Sébastien Bassong and took the lead in the second half thanks to Roman Pavlyuchenko's left-footed strike. Vedran Ćorluka's first goal in Spurs colours put daylight between the two teams and then a solo run from Jermain Defoe made the game safe at 3–0 and ended their only home fixture of the pre-season with a win.

August

Tottenham began the 2009–10 season with their first home start in five years against Liverpool. Spurs took the lead before half-time with a thunderbolt effort from unlikely goalscorer Benoît Assou-Ekotto. Liverpool equalised in the second half thanks to a penalty from Steven Gerrard but Tottenham won all three points with a header from Sébastien Bassong on his debut. Tottenham followed up on the Liverpool win with a 5–1 thrashing of Hull City at the KC Stadium. Spurs moved in front in just ten minutes with a strike from Jermain Defoe, followed soon after by Wilson Palacios, who scored his first league goal in English football to give Spurs a two-goal cushion. Further goals from Robbie Keane and another two Defoe goals – to earn his first hat-trick since 2004 – completed the scoring.

Spurs then faced London rivals West Ham in a scrappy affair. West Ham took the lead through a Carlton Cole volley, however only minutes later, Cole mis-placed a pass directly into the path of Jermain Defoe to give Tottenham a way back into the game. Spurs then took all three points when Aaron Lennon cut in from the right to slam the ball past Robert Green late in the game. Three wins out the first three games produced Tottenham's most successful start to a season since the double-winning team of 1961 and left them topping the table after the first three games of the season.

The League Cup then took centre stage as Tottenham took on Doncaster Rovers in the second round. Spurs eased their way to a 5–1 victory over their lower league counterparts, with Spurs having the added bonus of five different goal scorers; strikes from Tom Huddlestone, Jamie O'Hara, Peter Crouch, David Bentley and Roman Pavlyuchenko sealed the win and passage to the next round. In the ensuing draw, it was announced that Tottenham would face Preston North End in the third round of the cup.

Tottenham's final game of August was against newly promoted Birmingham City. Spurs battled their way to a 2–1 win, with Crouch scoring his first league goal for spurs before a Lee Bowyer tap in made the game 1–1. The match looked to be heading for a draw before Aaron Lennon scored the winner in the fifth minute of injury time. The game was marred for Spurs, however, as it was confirmed that influential midfielder Luka Modrić had suffered a fracture to his fibula, forcing him to miss a number of weeks in the season.

Nearing the end of August, two players left Spurs for new teams in the Premier League: French defender Pascal Chimbonda left to join Blackburn Rovers in £2 million deal, while German Kevin-Prince Boateng made a £4 million move to Portsmouth.

Following Tottenham's 2–1 win over Birmingham in which Modrić suffered a broken leg, Spurs entered the transfer market on deadline day for a midfielder. In the final hours, confirmation was made of the signing of fellow Croatian Niko Kranjčar from Portsmouth for £2.5 million. This transfer was thought to signal the end of Tottenham's transfer movement until on 3 September, it was announced that Spurs had signed veteran goalkeeper Jimmy Walker. Walker was a free agent following his release from West Ham.

Throughout the transfer window, a number of loans were negotiated. Early in the transfer window, youngsters Ryan Mason and Steven Caulker joined Yeovil Town on loan for six months, followed soon by Adel Taarabt returning to Queens Park Rangers for a season-long loan. The transfers continued, as Troy Archibald-Henville rejoined Exeter City until January 2010, and on the same day, it was revealed that goalkeeper Ben Alnwick would join newly relegated Norwich City for three months. After this, young Adam Smith joined Wycombe Wanderers for an initial one-month deal, subsequently followed by the development of the deal to send Andros Townsend to long-term affiliate Leyton Orient for a period of six months. After a good pre-season with Spurs, midfielder Jake Livermore signed for Derby County for a period of a month but later extended to six thanks to a series of good performances. Jon Obika joined his fellow Spurs loanees at Yeovil in mid-August, putting pen to paper for an initial one-month loan. The loans continued with Jamie O'Hara joining Portsmouth until January 2010, in an effort to get first team football, followed later by the loan of midfielder Sam Cox to Cheltenham for one month. The last loans of the summer transfer window involved three youth goalkeepers, with David Button, Oscar Jansson and Lee Butcher joining Crewe Alexandra, Exeter and Grays Athletic respectively.

After Spurs' good start to the season, Harry Redknapp and Jermain Defoe were awarded the Manager of the Month award and the Player of the Month award, respectively, for August.

Month summary

August league table

August game stats

September
Following the International break, Tottenham entered into a run of fixtures to test their early form, starting with the Champions Manchester United at White Hart Lane. Spurs made a fast start, with Jermain Defoe scoring an overhead kick within the first minute of the game. Manchester United, however, turned the game around, taking all three points thanks to goals from Ryan Giggs, Anderson and Wayne Rooney.

After the first loss of the season, Tottenham then had the challenge of Chelsea at Stamford Bridge, and although Spurs stayed in the game for long periods, they eventually succumbed to a 3–0 defeat. Tottenham had the chance to immediately bounce back in the League Cup facing Championship side Preston North End. The game played out on even footing with Preston giving as good as they got in the early stage until Tottenham finally got the breakthrough and ended the game with a 5–1 victory with Peter Crouch scoring a hat-trick in the process.

September ended with a home visit of newly promoted Burnley. Spurs strolled their way to victory with a 5–0 victory, Tottenham had the better of the game, with Robbie Keane scoring four of the goals and ended the month with a win, retaining their place in the top four.

Month summary

September league table

September game stats

October
October for Tottenham Hotspur began with a trip to the Reebok Stadium to face Bolton Wanderers. Bolton took the lead within five minutes when a throw-in landed at the feet of Ricardo Gardner who smashed the ball in the roof of the net. Tottenham battled back to find an equaliser through a Niko Kranjčar volley, Starting with a Wilson Palacios cross, Peter Crouch's downward header was met by the on-rushing Kranjčar to score his first Tottenham Hotspur goal. Early in the second half, slick football from Bolton earned them the lead for the second time, intricate play from Ricardo Gardner and Lee Chung-yong, set up a back-post header for Kevin Davies which squirmed over the line. Spurs rallied late on and struck another equaliser from a Vedran Ćorluka header to earn a point.

Following the draw at Bolton, Tottenham travelled to Fratton Park to play Harry Redknapp's former club, Portsmouth. Portsmouth had started the season very poorly and experiencing off-field trouble involving various owners of the club, Tottenham took the lead early in the game on the 29th minute mark with Ledley King powering in a header from a Niko Kranjčar Corner, Spurs doubled their lead on half time with Jermain Defoe sliding the ball home from a Jermaine Jenas through-ball. Portsmouth began to battle in the second half and scored a goal through ex-Tottenham player Kevin-Prince Boateng and following Jermain Defoe's red card for a stamp on Aaron Mokoena, a tense finished ensued, however after the injury time sending off of Michael Brown, Tottenham secured the three points.

After two away games, Spurs returned to White Hart Lane to face Stoke City. Tottenham monopolised possession and created many chances to which either poor finishing, or fantastic goalkeeping, prevented Tottenham from taking the lead. Late in the second half, Spurs went down to ten men after Aaron Lennon sustained an injury and all three allocated substitutions had been made. Stoke took advantage, with substitute Glenn Whelan hammering home the winner for the Potters to claim the maximum points. Tottenham rebounded from the disappointment of the loss three days later with a win over Everton in the League Cup. Goals from Tom Huddlestone and Robbie Keane ensured safe passage into the quarter-finals, to which Spurs were drawn against Manchester United at Old Trafford.

Tottenham ended October with a North London derby against Arsenal at the Emirates Stadium, Spurs entered the game without Luka Modrić, Aaron Lennon and the suspended Jermain Defoe and the absences meant that David Bentley made his first start of the season against his former club. The first half played out on level pegging until late in the half when a cross let Robin van Persie poke the ball home to give Arsenal the lead. Immediately following, Poor defending from Spurs allowed Cesc Fàbregas to double Arsenal's lead, just 50 seconds later. Tottenham entered the second half with a mountain to climb, however the game was over when more poor defending allowed Van Persie to score his second and Arsenal's third. The game ended 3–0 and Spurs ended the month in fifth place in the table.

Month summary

October league table

October game stats

November

Looking to respond from losing the most recent edition of the North London derby, Tottenham faced a home test against Sunderland. The game featured the return of a number of former players. Steed Malbranque, Andy Reid, Márton Fülöp, Fraizer Campbell and Darren Bent, making his first return to the Lane since his acrimonious departure in the summer. The game ended 2–0 to Tottenham thanks to goals from Robbie Keane and Tom Huddlestone, with Darren Bent having a penalty saved during the course of the match.

Following the win against Sunderland, Spurs played Wigan in a home fixture. In what would become an historic fixture, Tottenham won 9–1. Redknapp chose to start with Peter Crouch up front with Defoe, and the move paid off as Spurs took the lead after a Crouch header from an Aaron Lennon cross that put Spurs 1–0 up at half-time. The second half entered the record books as Spurs scored eight goals, five coming from Defoe. Other goals came from Lennon and Niko Kranjčar, along with a David Bentley free-kick, originally given as a Chris Kirkland own goal before the dubious goal panel awarded the effort to Bentley. It became Tottenham's biggest ever Premier League win, the second biggest in Premier League history, and only the second time any team had scored nine goals in the Premier League since its inception in 1992. Defoe also got himself in the record books, becoming only the third player to score five goals in a Premier League match, the others being Andy Cole and Alan Shearer.

Tottenham ended the month with a trip to Villa Park to face Aston Villa. Early into the first half, Aston Villa drew first blood with Gabriel Agbonlahor poking the ball in from close range to send Villa into the lead. Spurs fought back and in the 78th minute grabbed an equaliser with Michael Dawson hitting a volley into the net from just outside the area, earning a point for Tottenham and lifting the team into third place.

Month summary

November league table

November game stats

December

Month summary
December began with a trip to Old Trafford to face Manchester United in the League Cup quarter-final. Spurs lost 2–0 courtesy of two long-range goals from Darron Gibson to put the incumbent champions into the semi-final at Tottenham's expense.

Tottenham's first league game of the month was to journey to Merseyside to face Everton. Early into the second half, Spurs took the lead through Jermain Defoe and then quickly doubled their lead through a diving header from Michael Dawson. Everton began to fight back and clawed a goal back through Louis Saha, followed minutes later by the equalising goal from Tim Cahill to end the game at 2–2, with the two teams sharing the points following a last minute penalty miss from Defoe. Six days later, Tottenham faced Wolverhampton Wanderers at White Hart Lane. In a tight game, Wolves took all three points with a header from Kevin Doyle in the third minute with Tottenham unable to break down Wolves' defence.

Tottenham then competed against fellow top-four hopefuls Manchester City in a home fixture. Tottenham took the lead towards the end of an even first half with Niko Kranjčar volleying the ball home following a Peter Crouch knock-down. Spurs then doubled their lead nine minutes into the second half with Jermain Defoe bagging the second; a long-kick out from goalkeeper Heurelho Gomes was met by Peter Crouch who headed the ball down for strike partner Defoe to steer the ball in the net. Spurs sealed the win in extra time with a sweeping move, following a through ball from Aaron Lennon; Kranjčar squeezed through the City defence before poking the ball through Shay Given's legs to earn a 3–0 win.

Three days later, Spurs made the trip to Ewood Park to face Blackburn Rovers. Tottenham took the lead moments before half-time, Peter Crouch earning the lead with a headed goal. Spurs then grounded out the win after Crouch scored his second following a through-ball from Jermaine Jenas to win the game 2–0. For the Boxing Day fixture, Spurs travelled across London to face Fulham. The two teams played out a 0–0 draw to share the points on the day.

Tottenham ended the month, year and decade with a home fixture against London rivals West Ham in which Spurs won 2–0. Tottenham took the lead early with the returning Luka Modrić scrambling the ball home in the 11th minute before Jermain Defoe closed the game with a well-struck volley late in the match to put Spurs in the UEFA Champions League places of the Premier League table as they entered 2010.

December league table

December game stats

January transfer window

In the 2008–09 transfer window, Tottenham experienced a relatively quiet transition over the course of January. With the transfer window opening on the first day of the month, transfer speculation was mostly rebuffed by manager Harry Redknapp for the majority of the month, however Tottenham managed to secure the arrival of two players in the window. On 28 January, experienced forward Eiður Guðjohnsen joined the club on loan from Monaco on a deal effective until the season's end. Two days later saw the return of another former player in Younès Kaboul, re-signed from Portsmouth for a fee believed to be around £5 million in what was Tottenham's only permanent signing of the window.

The departures from Tottenham overshadowed the rest of the club's dealings both in terms of number and profile. The first sale involved the youngster Tomáš Pekhart, having just returned from a 12-month loan deal with Slavia Prague. Pekhart quickly joined Czech outfit Baumit Jablonec for an undisclosed fee. The only other outright leaving in January belonged to Troy Archibald-Henville, who after two successful loan spells with Exeter moved to Saint James' Park permanently, again for an undisclosed fee.

Loan exits dominated the departures, beginning early with the loan move of Jake Livermore to Peterborough United achieving completion on 8 January, six days later, youngster Andros Townsend joined Milton Keynes Dons on a season-long loan. The loans continued 13 days later, with Mexican international Giovani dos Santos re-uniting with his old manager Frank Rijkaard through a loan deal to Galatasaray until the end of the season, swiftly followed two days later, with Jamie O'Hara re-joining relegation battling Portsmouth until the season end after his initial loan ended in early January.

On the final day, Tottenham loaned out three players from the first team squad. Initially, young talent Kyle Naughton returned to the Championship, joining Middlesbrough until the end of the season, followed later in the day, with Scottish international Alan Hutton moving to Sunderland in a loan move until the league end in May, The transfer window closed in England at 5pm, however due to the Scottish transfer window remaining open until midnight, it paved the way for Robbie Keane to join Celtic in a loan deal until the end of the season, to the conclude Tottenham's 2009–10 January transfer window.

January

Month summary
Tottenham began the month with FA Cup duty, on 2 January, with a third-round tie against Peterborough United at White Hart Lane. Spurs strolled to a 4–0 win, courtesy of a brace from Niko Kranjčar, Jermain Defoe and a late Robbie Keane penalty. A fortnight later, Spurs played their first league game of 2010, facing Hull City at home. The match ended 0–0, with Hull goalkeeper Boaz Myhill earning plaudits for an inspired performance.

On 20 January, Tottenham travelled to Anfield to face Liverpool. Spurs succumbed to a 2–0 defeat, with Dutch striker Dirk Kuyt scoring both goals, an early long-range effort and a late penalty. Three days later, Tottenham returned to the F.A. Cup to face Leeds United in the fourth round at White Hart Lane. Tottenham took the lead before half-time through a poached effort from Peter Crouch before Leeds equalised through Jermaine Beckford, who scrambled in a corner. Tottenham re-took the lead thanks to a Roman Pavlyuchenko finish, his first goal since August, and held the scoreline until in the final moments. Michael Dawson was adjudged to have fouled Beckford in the penalty area and a penalty was duly awarded. Beckford converted the penalty six minutes into injury time to earn Leeds a replay.

Three days later, Spurs encountered Fulham in a home fixture. Tottenham scored early with Peter Crouch scoring a close-range finish before David Bentley settled the comfortable match with a free-kick goal with the help of a deflection. Tottenham concluded the month with a trip to Birmingham City. In an even game. Spurs took the lead deep into the second half through Jermain Defoe, before Liam Ridgewell scored a last-gasp header to equalise the game and end Tottenham's month with a draw.

January league table

January game stats

February

Month summary
The FA Cup opened February for Tottenham, facing Leeds United in a fourth round replay following the 2–2 draw at White Hart Lane in late January. Spurs took the lead at Elland Road midway through the first half with Jermain Defoe striking the ball home before Luciano Becchio equalised from close range at the end of the first half. Tottenham re-took the lead deep into the second half with Defoe's second before closing out the match in injury time with Defoe claiming a hat-trick and earning Spurs a place in the fifth round. Three days later, on 6 February, Spurs competed in their first Premier League match of the month, facing fellow top four contenders, Aston Villa at home. The game ended 0–0 with both teams earning a point in their quest for Champions League football.

Tottenham then travelled to Molineux to play Wolverhampton Wanderers in a contest which Wolves took all three points. A poor performance from Tottenham was punished by David Jones scoring the only goal of the game to secure the result for the relegation battlers.

Spurs returned to FA Cup action four days later with an away trip to Bolton Wanderers. Under new management with Owen Coyle at the helm, Bolton took the lead midway through the first half with Kevin Davies scoring a predatory strike. Spurs, however, forced a replay with Defoe slamming home the equaliser in the 61st minute to take the tie back to White Hart Lane.

Tottenham's away fixtures continued with a trip to Wigan, the team which succumbed to a 9–1 defeat in the reverse fixture earlier in season, Tottenham began the game well with a goal from Jermain Defoe and cruised to a 3–0 win with two late goals from the returning Roman Pavlyuchenko. Three days later, Spurs played Bolton in the FA fifth round replay in which they sealed a path to the sixth round in a comfortable 4–0 win, two goals from Pavlyuchenko and two own goals, one from goalkeeper Jussi Jääskeläinen and defender Andy O'Brien. This sealed their place in the next round of the FA Cup.

Spurs ended the month at home against Everton. Spurs controlled the first half and took the lead early through Roman Pavlyuchenko, with his fifth goal in three games, and a stunning Luka Modrić effort following good build-up play through Croatian compatriots Niko Kranjčar and Vedran Ćorluka. Everton responded in the second half with a strike from Yakubu, but the game ended 2–1 and Spurs ended February in the fourth Champions League place.

February league table

February game stats

March

Month summary

March began with Tottenham's trip to Craven Cottage to face Fulham in the FA Cup, where the tie ended 0–0, resulting in a replay having to be played later in the month.

Tottenham's first Premier League game of the month saw Blackburn visit White Hart Lane. The first-half played out on level pegging until just before the half-time whistle, where Jermain Defoe struck to give Spurs the lead. Tottenham extended their lead early in the second half through Roman Pavlyuchenko before Christopher Samba gave Blackburn hope, bringing the scoreline back to 2–1. Spurs wrapped up the points late in the game with Pavlyuchenko scoring his second and Tottenham's third to earn the three points.

A week later, Tottenham travelled north to face Stoke at the Britannia Stadium. The game remained 0–0 through to half-time, however in the first minute of the second-half, new loan signing Eiður Guðjohnsen powered his way to goal and scored his first goal for Spurs. Stoke clawed their way back into the game thanks to a Matthew Etherington penalty, given away after Benoît Assou-Ekotto was adjudged to have fouled Dave Kitson. Spurs secured the win, however, on the 77th minute mark, with Niko Kranjčar smashing the ball home to leave Spurs fourth in the league.

Four days later, Spurs returned to FA Cup action with the home replay against Fulham. Midway through the first-half, Fulham took the lead through a fine strike from ex-Tottenham player Bobby Zamora. Spurs rung the changes at half-time, making two substitutions and one immediately paid off, as the newly introduced David Bentley scored a free-kick to equalise the game. Tottenham took the lead ten minutes later through a Roman Pavlyuchenko volley and then put their name in the semi-final draw when Eiður Guðjohnsen squeezed home the third Spurs goal of the game.

Tottenham's last game of the month pitted Harry Redknapp, and numerous Spurs personnel, against their old club Portsmouth at White Hart Lane. Spurs took the lead early on through Peter Crouch before Niko Kranjčar compounded the game with a second goal and wrapped up the points for Tottenham.

March league table

March game stats

April

Month summary
The team went into April on the back of five-straight league victories for the first time since April 2007. The run ended, however, in a 3–1 defeat at the Stadium of Light to Sunderland. Darren Bent scored against his former club within a minute, stabbing home from close range from an early corner to give Sunderland the lead. Bent went on to double the scoreline from the penalty spot before half-time. Spurs goalkeeper Heurelho Gomes kept the score at 2–0 with two penalty stops before substitute Peter Crouch gave Spurs a route back into the game with a header, though only for a stunning Boudewijn Zenden volley to seal the points for Sunderland.

Following this was the FA Cup semi-final at Wembley Stadium. Tottenham entered the game as favourites against a recently relegated Portsmouth side. The game remained 0–0 for the 90 minutes and so entered extra time. Early in the first half of the extra 30, a Michael Dawson slip from a Portsmouth free-kick allowed Frédéric Piquionne to finish from a few yards out to give Portsmouth the initiative. Peter Crouch had a goal wrongly ruled out in the second half of extra time before ex-Tottenham player Kevin-Prince Boateng sealed the final place for Portsmouth with a last minute penalty.

Just three days later from disappointment of losing the FA Cup semi-final, Tottenham contested the North London derby against rivals Arsenal. Spurs took the lead in amazing fashion with league debutant Danny Rose scoring a wonder volley to give the home team a 1–0 lead. Spurs then doubled their lead a few minutes into the second half, with Gareth Bale tapping home from a Jermain Defoe through-ball. The introduction of the returning Robin van Persie led Gomes to make three miraculous saves to ensure Tottenham's lead before Nicklas Bendtner gave Arsenal a late consolation marker. The game finished 2–1 to give Spurs their first league win over Arsenal in 11 years.

The third game of the week came at White Hart Lane to league-leaders Chelsea. Spurs took the lead early in the first half from a Jermain Defoe penalty after John Terry handballed a Roman Pavlyuchenko flick-on. Gareth Bale scored his second goal of the week and doubled Tottenham's lead before half-time with a right-footed effort. Terry saw red in second half for two bookable offences of Pavlyuchenko and Bale respectively before Frank Lampard got a late consolation in injury time, but Spurs held on for another invaluable three points.

Tottenham faced their third consecutive top-four team when Spurs travelled to Old Trafford to face Manchester United the following weekend. After a goalless first half, United took the lead from the penalty spot in the first half after Benoît Assou-Ekotto brought down Patrice Evra in the area, with Ryan Giggs converting. Ledley King equalised with a header during the second half, before Nani chip and another Giggs penalty gave the points to United.

April league table

April game stats

May

Month summary
Tottenham began the final month of the season on the first day of the month with a home tie against Bolton, looking to keep the initiative in the race for fourth place. In a tense game, Tottenham won the game 1–0 thanks to a long range effort from Tom Huddlestone late in the first half to keep Spurs in the Champions League places and fate in their own hands.

Four days later, Tottenham travelled to Manchester to face the only remaining rival for the last Champions League spot, Manchester City, in a game which could have possibly decided the fate of the final place. Spurs and City battled out the first half with both teams creating chances to take the lead before Spurs gained a foothold in the second half. The game looked to be heading for a draw until on the 82nd minute, Peter Crouch scored a close-range header to give Tottenham the win and ensure the club Champions League football for the first time.

Spurs ended the 2009–10 Premier League with an away trip to relegated Burnley. Tottenham took an early lead with Gareth Bale powering home in the third minute, then doubled the advantage after a Luka Modrić solo effort. Burnley clawed a goal back moments before half-time through Wade Elliott prodding the ball in through good play. Lingering thoughts of achieving third place above rivals Arsenal were extinguished after the Gunners won comfortably against Fulham in their final game. Early in the second half, Burnley equalised through Jack Cork and then took the lead minutes later through a Martin Paterson tap-in. Burnley sealed the points with a late Elliott goal to give Burnley a 4–2 win over Tottenham who, despite the final result, finished fourth, their highest ever Premier League finish.

May league table

May game stats

Premier League table

Transfers

In

Out

Completed loan arrivals

Completed loan departures

Squad list

Long-term injury list

Match results

Pre-season

Premier League

FA Cup

League Cup

Statistics

Appearances

Goal scorers 

The list is sorted by shirt number when total goals are equal.

Clean sheets

The list is sorted by shirt number when total clean sheets are equal.

Premier League results by matchday

References

External links
Official Club site
BBC – Tottenham club news
Football 365 Spurs Homepage

2009–10 Premier League by team
2009-10